Oxabolone is a synthetic anabolic-androgenic steroid (AAS) of the nandrolone (19-nortestosterone) group which was never marketed. It can be formulated as the cipionate ester prodrug oxabolone cipionate, which, in contrast, has been marketed for medical use.

Oxabolone is on the World Anti-Doping Agency's list of prohibited substances, and is therefore banned from use in most major sports.

The 17α-methylated analogue of oxabolone is methylhydroxynandrolone (4-hydroxy-17α-methyl-19-nortestosterone) and the 17α- and 19-methylated derivative of oxabolone is oxymesterone (4-hydroxy-17α-methyltestosterone).

References

External links
What Are Anabolic Steroids?

Androgens and anabolic steroids
Diols
Estranes
Ketones
World Anti-Doping Agency prohibited substances